Harley Raymond McCollum (February 28, 1916 – June 7, 1984) was an American football tackle in the All-America Football Conference for the New York Yankees and Chicago Rockets. He played college football at Tulane University and was drafted in the sixth round of the 1942 NFL Draft by the Washington Redskins.

1916 births
1984 deaths
All-American college football players
American football tackles
Chicago Rockets players
New York Yankees (AAFC) players
Tulane Green Wave football players